The Devil's Mirror (Chinese: 風雷魔鏡) is a 1972 Hong Kong film by the Shaw Brothers studio and the debut film of Sun Chung.

Cast
Shu Pei Pei
Lau Dan
Lee Ga Sai
Wong Hap
Cheng Miu
Tung Lam
Chan Shen
Chai No
Lee Ho
Tong Tin Hei
Sammo Hung

References

1972 films
Hong Kong martial arts films
1970s action films
1970s Mandarin-language films
Kung fu films
Shaw Brothers Studio films
1970s Hong Kong films